Wesley Johnson may refer to:

Wesley Johnson (basketball) (born 1987), American basketball player 
Wesley Johnson (cricketer) (born 1877), Barbadian cricketer
Wesley Johnson (entertainer) or 2Play (born 1977), British musician and mixed martial artist
Wesley Johnson (American football), American football player
Wesley Momo Johnson (1944–2021), Liberian politician
Wess (born Wesley Johnson, 1945–2009), American singer and bass guitarist

See also
Wes Johnson, actor
Wes Johnson (baseball), American baseball coach